Vladimir Velman (born 25 September 1945 in Tallinn) is an Estonian politician and journalist. He has been a member of VIII, IX, X, XI, XII, XIII Riigikogu.

Since 1994 he is a member of Estonian Centre Party.

References

Living people
1945 births
Estonian Reform Party politicians
Estonian journalists
Estonian editors
Members of the Riigikogu, 1995–1999
Members of the Riigikogu, 1999–2003
Members of the Riigikogu, 2003–2007
Members of the Riigikogu, 2007–2011
Members of the Riigikogu, 2011–2015
Members of the Riigikogu, 2015–2019
Tallinn University of Technology alumni
Politicians from Tallinn